
Year 256 BC was a year of the pre-Julian Roman calendar. At the time it was known as the Year of the Consulship of Longus and Caedicius/Regulus (or, less frequently, year 498 Ab urbe condita). The denomination 256 BC for this year has been used since the early medieval period, when the Anno Domini calendar era became the prevalent method in Europe for naming years.

Events 
 By place 

 Roman Republic 
 Rome aims for a quick end to hostilities in the First Punic War and decides to invade the Carthaginian colonies in Northern Africa to force the enemy to accept terms. A major fleet is built, including transports for the army and its equipment, and warships for their protection. Carthage under Hamilcar tries to intervene but a force under the Roman general and consul Marcus Atilius Regulus and his colleague Lucius Manlius Vulso Longus defeat the Carthaginian fleet in the Battle of Cape Ecnomus off the southern coast of Sicily.
 Following the Battle of Cape Ecnomus, the Romans land an army near Carthage and begin ravaging the Carthaginian countryside. The Roman army soon forces the capitulation of Clupea, a town 40 miles (64 kilometres) east of Carthage. After setting up Roman defenses for the city, the two consuls receive instructions from Rome that Vulso is to set sail for Rome, taking most of the fleet with him. Regulus, on the other hand, is to stay with the infantry and cavalry to finish the war.

 China 
 The Great Wall of China construction starts.
 Luoyang falls without much resistance to the armies of the Qin, ending the reign of the emperor Zhou Nan Wang. Although a successor was appointed as Dong Zhou Hui Wang, traditionally in Chinese history this is considered the end of the Zhou Dynasty.
 The Du Jiang Yan Irrigation System is constructed, ending flooding and irrigating thousands of square miles of land through an ingeniously designed system.

Births 
 Liu Bang, founder of the Han Dynasty of China (d. 195 BC)

Deaths 
 Zhou Nan Wang, Chinese king of the Zhou Dynasty

References